Tael, also known as the tahil and by other names, can refer to any one of several weight measures used in East Asia and Southeast Asia. It usually refers to the Chinese tael, a part of the Chinese system of weights and currency. The Chinese tael was standardized to 50 grams in 1959.

In Hong Kong and Singapore, it is equivalent to 10 mace or  catty, albeit with slightly different metric equivalents in these two places. These Chinese units of measurement are usually used in Chinese herbal medicine stores as well as gold and silver exchange.

Names 

The English word tael comes through Portuguese from the Malay word , meaning "weight". Early English forms of the name such as "tay" or "taes" derive from the Portuguese plural of tael, .

Tahil ( in Singaporean English) is used in Malay and English today when referring to the weight in Malaysia, Singapore, and Brunei, where it is still used in some contexts especially related to the significant Overseas Chinese population.

In Chinese, tael is written  (simplified as ) and has the Mandarin pronunciation liǎng. The phrase "half a catty, eight taels"  bàn jīn, bā liǎng) is still used to mean two options are exactly equivalent, similar to the English "six of one, half-dozen of the other".

Historical usage 

In China, there were many different weighting standards of tael depending on the region or type of trade. The most common government measure was the Kuping tael, weighing .

As in China, Japan and Korea used the tael (Japanese: 両; Hepburn: ryō) as both a unit of weight and, by extension, a currency.

Tael currency

Imperial China 

Traditional Chinese silver sycees and other currencies of fine metals were not denominated or made by a central mint and their value was determined by their weight in taels. They were made by individual silversmiths for local exchange, and as such the shape and amount of extra detail on each ingot were highly variable; square and oval shapes were common but "boat", flower, tortoise and others are known. The tael was still used in Qing dynasty coinage as the basis of the silver currency and sycee remained in use until the end of the dynasty in 1911. Common weights were 50, 10, 5 and one tael. Before the year 1840 the government of the Qing dynasty had set the official exchange rate between silver sycees and copper-alloy cash coins was set at 1,000 wén for 1 tael of silver before 1820, but after the year 1840 this official exchange rate was double to 2,000 wén to 1 tael.

During the reign of the Xianfeng Emperor, the government of the Qing dynasty was forced to re-introduce paper money, among the paper money it produced were the Hubu Guanpiao (戶部官票) silver notes that were denominated in taels.

The forced opening of China during the Qing dynasty created a number of treaty ports alongside the China's main waterways and its coastal areas, these treaty ports would fundamentally change both the monetary system of China as well as its banking system, these changes were introduced by the establishment of European and American merchant houses and later banks that would engage in the Chinese money exchange and trade finance.

Between the years 1840 and 1900, 1 market tael was worth 1.38 Spanish dollars.

Various Western banking companies, the largest of which were the HSBC, and later Japanese banking companies started to begin to accept deposits. They would issue banknotes which were convertible into silver; these banknotes were popularized among the Chinese public that resided in the treaty ports.

An important development during this era was the establishment of the Imperial Maritime Customs Service. This agency was placed in charge of collecting transit taxes for traded goods that were shipped both in and out of the Chinese Empire, these rules and regulations were all stipulated in various trade treaties that were imposed on the Qing by the Western colonial powers. Because these changes were implemented during the height of the Taiping Rebellion, the Western powers had managed to take over the complete administration of the Qing's maritime customs from the imperial Chinese governmental bureaucracy.

The Imperial Maritime Customs Service developed the Haikwan tael (海關兩), this new form of measurement was an abstract unit of silver tael that would become the nationwide standard unit of account in silver for any form of Customs tax. The Haikwan tael was preferred over the Kuping tael (庫平兩) by many merchants across China, this was because the units of the Kuping tael varied often to the advantage of imperial tax collectors, this form of corruption was an extra source of income for government bureaucrats at the expense of traders. The Haikwan tael unit was completely uniform, it was very carefully defined, and its creation had been negotiated among the various colonial powers and the government of the Qing dynasty. The Haikwan tael was on average 5% to 10% larger than the various local tael units that had existed in China, this was done as it deliberately excluded any form of extra surcharges which were embedded in the other units of the silver tael that existed as a form of intermediary income for local government tax collection, these surcharges were added to local taels as a form of corruption and these taxes never reached the imperial government under the traditional fiscal regime.

Near the end of the Qing dynasty, one  (sycee, or ) is about 50 taels.

Conversion rates in imperial China 

The local tael took precedence over any central measure. The conversion rates between various common taels were well known.

Republic of China 

In the year 1933 the government of the Republic of China abolished the tael and completely replaced it with the yuan in a process known as the fei liang gai yuan (廢兩改元; literally: "Abolishing tael and changing to yuan"). During this time the Republican government cleared all banknotes denominated in the ancient tael currency, making all bills which used this currency unit obsolete.

Purchasing power 

Modern studies suggest that, on purchasing power parity basis, one tael of silver was worth about 4,130 RMB (modern Chinese yuan) in the early Tang dynasty, 2,065 RMB in the late Tang dynasty, and 660.8 RMB in the mid Ming dynasty. Today the price of silver is about 154 RMB/tael.

Thailand 

The Thai equivalent of the tael is known as the tamlueng, a term derived from Khmer. It was used as a unit of currency equal to four baht; nowadays, as a unit of weight it is fixed at 60 grams.

Current usage 

The tael is still in use as a weight measurement in a number of countries though usually only in limited contexts. In English-speaking countries, measurement scales that support Tael as a unit will typically abbreviate it as "tl".

Ethnic Chinese regions

Chinese mainland 

China's standard market tael of 31.25 g was modified by the People's Republic of China in 1959. The new market tael was 50 g or  catty (500 g) to make it compatible with metric measures. (see Chinese unit for details.) In Shanghai, silver is still traded in taels.

Some foodstuffs in China are sold in units also called "taels", but which do not necessarily weigh one tael. For cooked rice, the weight of the tael is approximated using special tael-sized ladles. Other items sold in taels include the shengjian mantou and the xiaolongbao, both small buns commonly found in Shanghai. In these cases, one tael is traditionally four and eight buns respectively.

Hong Kong and Singapore 

The tael is a legal weight measure in Hong Kong, and is still in active use.  In Hong Kong, one tael is 37.799364167 g, and in ordinance 22 of 1884 is  oz. avoir. Similar to Hong Kong, in Singapore, one tael is defined as  ounce and is approximated as 37.7994 g

Taiwan 

The Taiwan tael is 37.5 g and is still used in some contexts. Although the catty (equal to 16 taels) is still frequently used in Taiwan, the tael is only used for precious metals and herbal medicines.

Elsewhere

Vietnam 

In French Indochina, the colonial administration fixed the tael as 100 g, which is commonly used at food markets where many items typically weigh in the 100–900 g range. Real estate prices are often quoted in taels of gold rather than the local currency over concerns over monetary inflation.

See also 

 History of Chinese currency
 Economic history of China

References

External links  

 

 
 

Currencies of China
Modern obsolete currencies
Units of mass
Chinese units in Hong Kong